Davina Philtjens (born 26 February 1989) is a Belgian professional footballer who plays as a left back for Italian Serie A club US Sassuolo and the Belgium women's national team.

Career
Philtjens previously played for Standard Liège in the Belgian Championship, and for Ajax in the Eredivisie.

Career statistics 

Scores and results list Belgium's goal tally first, score column indicates score after each Philtjens goal.

Honours 
Standard Liège
 Belgian Women's First Division: 2008–09, 2010–11, 2011–12
 Belgian Women's Cup: 2011–12, 2013–14
 BeNe Super Cup: 2011–12, 2012–13
 Belgian Women's Super Cup: 2012–13
 BeNe League runner-up: 2012–13, 2013–14

Ajax
 Eredivisie: 2017–18

References

External links 
 
 

1989 births
Living people
Sportspeople from Hasselt
Footballers from Limburg (Belgium)
Belgian women's footballers
Women's association football defenders
Belgium women's international footballers
Belgium women's youth international footballers
FIFA Century Club
UEFA Women's Euro 2022 players
Super League Vrouwenvoetbal players
BeNe League players
Eredivisie (women) players
Serie A (women's football) players
Standard Liège (women) players
AFC Ajax (women) players
Fiorentina Women's F.C. players
Belgian expatriate footballers
Belgian expatriate sportspeople in the Netherlands
Expatriate women's footballers in the Netherlands
Belgian expatriate sportspeople in Italy
Expatriate women's footballers in Italy
UEFA Women's Euro 2017 players
21st-century Belgian women